Lawncrest is a neighborhood in the "Near" (lower) Northeast Philadelphia, Pennsylvania. The name is an amalgam of Lawndale and Crescentville, the two primary communities that make up the neighborhood. The Philadelphia Inquirer does not consider Lawncrest to be a neighborhood.

The primary ZIP Code is 19111 (Fox Chase Post Office) for the area North of Comly Street and 19120 (Olney P.O.) for the area South of Comly Street. Most of the southern end of the Community is actually built on the former property of the Wentz Farm. Portions of the East side of Crescentville are actually built over former swamp land, while the West side was built on more stable bedrock.Rising Sun Avenue (formerly 2nd Street Pike) is usually identified as the main artery through Lawncrest, though originally, Ashmead Road/Levick Street was the primary Road.

History 
Swedes and Germans settled the area as early as 1638.

The community can trace its roots back to the 19th century as a small German community known to some as Marburg. Parts of Crescentville were known as "Grubbtown" during the Civil War.  The main artery of the community, Rising Sun Avenue, was originally a toll road known as the Kensington & Oxford Turnpike.  A sole remaining marker of this toll road once stood in front of the Engine 64 Firehouse at Rising Sun and Benner, near the bus stop.

Geography 
The area of Lawncrest extends from Tacony Creek Park to Tyson Avenue.   Adjacent neighborhoods include:
Fox Chase/Burholme to the north, Oxford Circle/Castor Gardens and Frankford to the east and southeast, and Olney, and Feltonville to the south and southwest. To the West is Cheltenham Township, Montgomery County.

Transportation 
The Newtown Branch/New York Short Line of the Reading Railroad (now SEPTA/CSX) separates Lawncrest from Montgomery County. Tookany/Tacony Creek also skirts through a portion of the Community.

Two SEPTA Fox Chase Line Regional Rail stations serve the community: Lawndale Station at Robbins and Newtown Aves and Cheltenham Station at Martins Mill Road and Hasbrook Ave. Crescentville Station, closed in the 1970s, was located at the bottom of Godfrey Ave, behind Bond Bread and was nothing more than a dirt/gravel platform. A second Crescentville Station, which served the Frankford Branch of the Reading RR, was located directly behind the Bond Bread building on the south side of the railroad right of way. It was closed when passenger service ended on that branch in the 1930s.

Several SEPTA bus lines also serve the community. The route 18 bus runs from Cedarbrook Mall–Olney Terminal up to Fox Chase using Rising Sun, while the routes 19, 24, 26 and 67 buses serve the Eastern portions of the neighborhood, connecting to the Olney, Frankford and Fern Rock Transportation Centers via direct service or single transfer. All routes have connecting service to the Broad Street subway and Market-Frankford elevated lines.

Churches 
There are about a dozen Protestant Churches within the Community, the oldest being Trinity Oxford Church which dates back to 1698.

St. William's Parish, founded in 1920, covers most of the Crescentville end of the community and part of the lower end of Lawndale, from Magee Avenue South, while the upper end of Lawndale approximately covers the area of Presentation B.V.M. Parish which was founded in 1890 and also serves a large portion of the southeast corner of Cheltenham PA, in Montgomery County.

Hill Creek Apartments 
Originally known as Hill Creek Project. The public housing project was built on 23.4 acres during Franklin Roosevelts Administration was opened in March 1938, purportedly the last such project built during his administration. Located on a hill overlooking the Tookany Creek in North East Philadelphia on the corner of Rising Sun and Adams Avenues. in the area known as Lawncrest Administered by the Philadelphia Public Housing Authority, it has 334 units of single-family, two-story apartments. and provides Section 8 (housing) for low-income families.

Culture
According to Kathleen McDonough, who grew up in the area, "Households were typically ones in which dad worked and mom stayed home."

The Lawncrest area is a neighborhood locally known as the “9” with gang culture around the neighborhood. Lawncrest is known for its deadly rivalry with other neighborhoods like Olney, Philadelphia.

Schools
It is in the School District of Philadelphia Most teens who live in Lawncrest attend either Northeast High School (public), or Samuel Fels High School (public). Two Public elementary schools served the area - Ben Franklin Universal Creighton Charter School, the Truebright Science Academy (a charter school grades 7-12) .and in addition, Presentation BVM Parish School and Cedar Grove Christian Academy (in the former Lawndale Public School building) serve the private sector in education. St. William Parish School Closed in 2012 and is now the location of MaST II Charter School. Until 1991 Students attended Olney High School.

McDonough stated that children who attended public and Catholic schools were known as a "public" or a "Catholic", respectively, and that children tended to attend schools in their own communities.

Federal Government 
The Naval Inventory Control Point is located at 700 Robbins St, Philadelphia, Pennsylvania 19111.

Notable residents and natives

Ryan Bird , Cheltenham Ave. Step Ball & Wall Ball Co-Champion (w/Larry Bird IV) 1988-1992

Lawncrest Man of the Year 1977-Present
https://www.linkedin.com/in/ryan-bird-0804b0a2
-->
Frank Bender, facial reconstruction artist and fine artist
Bil Keane, creator of "Family Circus" comic strip
Andrea McArdle, original Annie on Broadway, singer, actress
Matt Ox, rapper and singer

.

References 

Neighborhoods in Philadelphia
Northeast Philadelphia